Draw Breath is the third album released by The Nels Cline Singers in 2007. It featured both abrasive musical textures and gentler compositions such as "Caved-In Heart Blues" and "The Angel of Angels," the latter of which The New York Times called one of the prettiest works of Nels Cline's career.

Track listing
All tracks by Nels Cline

 "Caved-In Heart Blues" - 6:52
 "Attempted" - 8:50
 "Confection" - 4:17
 "An Evening at Pops'" - 16:03
 "The Angel of Angels" - 6:21
 "Recognize I" - 4:09
 "Mixed Message" - 14:58
 "Recognize II" - 3:41
 "Squirrel of God" - 8:19

Personnel
 Devin Hoff - contrabass
 Scott Amendola - drums, percussion, "Live" Electronics, effects
 Nels Cline - Electric guitar, acoustic guitar, effects 
 Glenn Kotche - percussion, crotales, glockenspiel on track #9

References

Jazz fusion albums by American artists
2007 albums
Cryptogramophone Records albums
Nels Cline Singers albums